Sahar Khodayari (c. 1990 – 9 September 2019), also known as Blue Girl was an Iranian fan of Esteghlal F.C. In March 2019, she attempted to enter the male-only Azadi Stadium disguised as a man to watch a match played by the team, against the national ban on women at such events. On 2 September the same year, she was told by the Islamic Revolutionary Court of Tehran that she may face a six-month prison sentence. After leaving court, she committed suicide through self-immolation in front of the building. She died a week later of her injuries. Khodayari's self-immolation has generated much debate in Iran about the government's restrictions on women.

With Iran chosen to host select qualifier games for the 2022 FIFA World Cup, FIFA has said that Iran must allow women into the stadium to see those international football matches. Iran guaranteed such entry for the first time after 40 years, one month after Sahar's death.

Incident and suicide 
Sahar Khodayari was born in 1990 to a family in Salm, Kiar County, Chaharmahal and Bakhtiari Province, Iran. Her family includes a sister. The family later lived in Tehran. Khodayari graduated from university with degrees in English and in computer sciences. As a young woman she became a fan of the game of football. She was identified as "Blue Girl" on social media, after the colors of her favorite club, Esteghlal FC, based in Tehran.

In March 2019 Khodayari tried to enter Azadi Stadium to watch an AFC Champions League match between Esteghlal and Al Ain FC. Because women in Iran have been prohibited since 1981 from attending football matches, she disguised herself as a man to enter undetected. (Women may attend other sports, such as volleyball matches.) But the security guards noticed Khodayari and arrested her for violating the prohibition; they took her to the local NAJA. She was held for three nights in jail before being released on bail, pending her court case.

According to Amnesty International, Sahar Khodayari was ordered six months later to attend a Revolutionary Court in Tehran on 2 September 2019 to give a reason for her attempt to enter the stadium. She was charged with "openly committing a sinful act by appearing in public without a hijab" and "insulting officials". While no verdict was delivered in her case because the judge was unavailable, she was reportedly told she might face a six-month jail sentence. After Khodayari left the court, she poured petrol on herself and set herself on fire outside the courthouse.

She died in hospital one week later due to third-degree burns that she had suffered (approximately 90% of her skin surface area had been affected). According to DW, the six-month jail sentence had been affirmed while she was in hospital.

In October 2019, Iranian women were allowed to attend a football match in Iran for the first time in 40 years. However, in 2022, Iranian women were blocked from entering the stadium for a World Cup qualifier.

Reactions

National 
 Gholam Hossein Ismaili, the spokesman of the judicial system of Iran, claimed that Sahar Khodayari had not been convicted nor sentenced to 6 months' imprisonment, as was reported.
In an interview with the state-owned TV, before her family was told not to speak to the media, her sister had said that Khodayari was receiving treatment for mental illness. There were rumors that she had tried to kill herself while in university. Because of this, authorities might have reduced charges against her, if they had chosen to do so.
 Ali Karimi said that Iranians should "boycott football matches to protest Khodayari's death."

Worldwide 
 FIFA made a statement about Khodayari's death: "We are aware of that tragedy and deeply regret it." Iran has been chosen to host 2022 FIFA World Cup qualification matches and FIFA has said the country must provide for free entry of women to those international matches.
 Amnesty International said, "What happened to Sahar Khodayari is heart-breaking and exposes the impact of the Iranian authorities' appalling contempt for women's rights in the country."
 A spokesman for the U.S. Department of State said: "The death of the Blue Girl, Sahar Khodayari, is another proof for the fact that the Iranian people are the greatest victims of the Islamic regime."
 On 12 September 2019 an arrest warrant was issued for Saba Kamali, an Iranian actress, after her post on Instagram in support of Khodayari. She had published an imaginary dialogue with Husayn ibn Ali questioning the relevance of the ceremonial Ashura event compared to Iran's discriminatory laws.
According to France 24, Iranian football fans reacted with shock and anger following Khodayari's death. By using #BanIRSportsFederations, Iranians called for the Islamic regime's sports federations to be banned from participating in world sport. 
Some local football stars and known figures responded to Khodayari's death with public statements.

Film 
The Recess is an Iran-Spain short film inspired by the story of Sahar Khodayari. Directed by Navid Nikkhah Azad, The Recess has been screened in more than 110 international film festivals including FIAPF-accredited, OSCAR and Goya Awards qualifying festivals and has won 19 awards.

See also
 Homa Darabi
 Offside (2006 Iranian film)
 2017–19 Iranian protests against compulsory hijab
 Convention on the Elimination of All Forms of Discrimination Against Women

Notes

References

Year of birth uncertain
2019 deaths
Sex segregation enforcement
Suicides by self-immolation
Suicides in Iran
Esteghlal F.C.
Controversies in Iran
Khodayari
2019 suicides